Rajah Siawi (sometimes called Rajah Siagu) was the ruler of the Rajahnate of Butuan and Calagan (Surigao) during the arrival of Ferdinand Magellan in Limasawa Island. A cousin of Rajah Humabon of the Rajahnate of Cebu, Rajah Siawi was one of the first rulers (along with Rajah Kulambo, the ruler of Limasawa Island) to accept Christianity and attend the first Catholic Mass in the Philippine Islands.

Rajah Siawi and Rajah Kulambo formed a Blood Compact with Ferdinand Magellan in March 1521, claiming ownership of the islands for King Charles V. He named the island as the Archipelago of Saint Lazarus on March 16, 1521.

References 

 Anchi Hoh.“Catholicism in the Philippines during the Spanish Colonial Period 1521-1898”.Library of Congress.(Accessed on 10 February 2021).
 “The Blood Compact”.Bohol-Philippines.com.(Accessed on 10 February 2021).
 “Historical Development”.Lalawigan ng Agusan del Norte.(Accessed on 10 February 2021).
 Nowell, C.E. (1962). "Antonio Pigafetta's account". Magellan's Voyage Around the World. Evanston, IL: Northwestern University Press. hdl:2027/mdp.39015008001532. OCLC 347382
Butuan
16th-century rulers in Asia
Christian monarchs